John Cranford Adams (October 11, 1903 - November 24, 1986) was an American educator and academic administrator who served as the second president of the Hofstra University from 1944–1964.

Biography 

Adams was born October 11, 1903 to John Davis and Mary (Cranford) Adams. He attended Cornell University, where he was a member of the Quill and Dagger society and received a B.A. in 1926 and a Ph.D. in 1935. He also studied at King's College, Cambridge, England from 1926-28.

He was an instructor in English at Syracuse University from 1926 to 1928 and at Cornell from 1930-37. He taught at Cornell from 1937 to 1944, first as assistant professor and then associate professor. He was named the second President of Hofstra University in 1944. During his 20 years tenure at Hofstra, the school grew from a small liberal arts college of 367 students to a major university with an enrollment of 9,000. The campus theater John Cranford Adams Playhouse and the John Cranford Adams Chair in Literature are named in his honor.

References

Cornell University alumni
Alumni of King's College, Cambridge
Hofstra University faculty
Syracuse University faculty
Presidents of Hofstra University
1903 births
1986 deaths
Educators from Massachusetts
20th-century American academics